Weightlifting was contested from September 21 to October 1, 1986, at the 1986 Asian Games in Olympic Weightlifting Gymnasium, Seoul, South Korea. The competition included only men's events for ten different weight categories. China topped the medal table with five gold medals, South Korea won three while Japan and Lebanon each won one gold medal.

Medalists

Medal table

References
 Results

External links
 Weightlifting Database

 
1986 Asian Games events
1986
Asian Games
1986
International weightlifting competitions hosted by South Korea